S. Ramanathan (1917-1988) was a Carnatic music singer and musicologist.  He was awarded the Sangeetha Kalanidhi title in 1985 by Madras Music Academy.

He learned music from Tiger Varadachariar, Sabesa Iyer, Ponniah Pillai, and Sathur Krishna Iyengar. Post this, he also trained under Vidwan :Valadi Krishnaiyer known as "Kirthana Kutir" - Granary of Kirthanas for vocal music and Devakottai Narayana Iyengar for the veena and acquired proficiency in both fields.

He received a Ph.D. in ethnomusicology from Wesleyan University, Middletown, Connecticut, where he also taught.

He had disciples who have carved names for themselves such as  P. Unnikrishnan, S. Sowmya, Savithri Sathyamurthy, Seetha Narayanan, Vasumathi Nagarajan, Sukanya Raghunathan (veena), his daughter Geetha Ramanathan Bennett (veena player and a renowned short story writer in Tamil) and her husband Frank Bennett,  Vidya Hariharan (veena and vocal), Thiagarajan/Raju (Vocal), Banumathy Raghuraman (veena), Latha Radhakrishnan (violin and vocal), Padma Gadiyar (veena), Vanathy Raghuraman (Vocal), and the Krishnan Sisters (Padmapriya (veena and vocal), Harini (vocal) and Subhapriya (vocal). 

He also has  composed many varnams and kritis, which have been popularized by his disciples. The American ethnomusicologist David Nelson studied with him.

In 1981 Ramanathan released an album of Carnatic music, Navagraha Krtis (The 9 Planets), Cāturdaṡa Rāgamālika (The 14 Worlds) and Srī Gurunā: By Muttuswāmī Dīkṣitar (1775-1835), on Folkways Records.

See also
Ramnad Raghavan
T. Ranganathan

References
  
S. Ramanathan page
Ramanathan page

Musica Nirvana biography
Navagraha Krtis (The 9 Planets), Cāturdaṡa Rāgamālika (The 14 Worlds) and Srī Gurunā: By Muttuswāmī Dīkṣitar (1775-1835) at Smithsonian Folkways

External links
S. Ramanathan materials in the South Asian American Digital Archive (SAADA)

Male Carnatic singers
Carnatic singers
1917 births
1988 deaths
Wesleyan University alumni
Wesleyan University faculty
Carnatic composers
20th-century Indian male classical singers
20th-century Indian composers
Indian male composers
Recipients of the Sangeet Natak Akademi Fellowship